Hagal may refer to:
Hagall, the Younger Futhark h rune 
Hagal (Armanen rune), the derived rune in Germanic mysticism
Hagal (Dune), a fictional planet in Frank Herbert's Dune universe